The 1984 Melbourne Outdoor, also known as the Victorian Championships, was a Grand Prix men's tennis tournament held in Melbourne, Australia. It was the second edition of the tournament and was held from 24 December until 30 December 1984 and was played on outdoor grass courts. Unseeded Dan Cassidy won the singles title.

Finals

Singles
 Dan Cassidy defeated  John Fitzgerald 7–6, 7–6
 It was Cassidy's only singles title of his career.

Doubles
 Broderick Dyke /  Wally Masur defeated  Mike Bauer /  Scott McCain 7–6, 3–6, 7–6

References

External links
 ITF tournament edition details

Melbourne Outdoor
1984 in Australian tennis
Sports competitions in Melbourne